Ahmed Moein Mohammed Doozandeh (born 20 October 1995) is a Qatari footballer who plays for Al-Duhail SC as a defensive midfielder. He has Iranian origin.

In November 2015, Moein was awarded the Asian Young Footballer of the Year award by the AFC. On 29 August 2017, he joined Segunda División club Cultural y Deportiva Leonesa.

Honours

Club
El Jaish
Qatar Cup: 2016

Country
Qatar U20
AFC U-19 Championship: 2014

References

External links
 
 

1995 births
Living people
People from Doha
Qatari footballers
Qatari people of Iranian descent
Association football midfielders
Qatar Stars League players
Aspire Academy (Qatar) players
El Jaish SC players
K.A.S. Eupen players
Cultural Leonesa footballers
Al-Duhail SC players
Qatar SC players
Al-Wakrah SC players
Qatar youth international footballers
Qatar international footballers
Qatari expatriate sportspeople in Spain
Qatari expatriate sportspeople in Belgium
Qatari expatriate footballers
Expatriate footballers in Belgium
Expatriate footballers in Spain
Naturalised citizens of Qatar
Sportspeople of Iranian descent
2019 Copa América players